Pommiers is the name or part of the name of several communes in France:

 Pommiers, Aisne, in the Aisne département
 Pommiers, Gard, in the Gard département
 Pommiers, Indre, in the Indre département
 Pommiers, Rhône, in the Rhône département
 Pommiers-en-Forez, in the Loire département
 Pommiers-la-Placette, in the Isère département
 Pommiers-Moulons, in the Charente-Maritime département
 Pommier, in the Pas-de-Calais département
 Pommier-de-Beaurepaire, in the Isère département